The Algeria national football team represents the country of Algeria in international association football. It is fielded by Algerian Football Federation, the governing body of football in Algeria, and competes as a member of the Confederation of African Football (CAF), which encompasses the countries of Africa. Algeria competed in their first match on 6 January 1963, a 2–1 win with Bulgaria at Stade municipal. This table takes into account all official Algeria matches played up to and including 19 November 2022.

Algeria have competed in numerous competitions, and all players who have played in 25 or more matches, either as a member of the starting eleven or as a substitute, are listed below. Each player's details include his playing position while with the team, the number of caps earned and goals scored in all international matches, and details of the first and most recent matches played in. The names are initially ordered by number of caps (in descending order), then by date of debut, then by alphabetical order.

Players

See also
List of Algeria international footballers born outside Algeria
:Category:Algeria international footballers

Notes

References

 
Association football player non-biographical articles